is a Japanese footballer who plays for Montedio Yamagata.

Career statistics

Club
Updated to 23 February 2019.

1Includes Promotion Playoffs, Suruga Bank Championship, J. League Championship and FIFA Club World Cup.

Honours

Club
Kyoto Sanga
Emperor's Cup Runner-up : 2011

Kashima Antlers
J1 League (1): 2016
Emperor's Cup (1): 2016
J. League Cup (1): 2015
Japanese Super Cup (1): 2017
Suruga Bank Championship (1): 2013
AFC Champions League (1): 2018

References

External links

Profile at Kashima Antlers

1990 births
Living people
Association football people from Osaka Prefecture
People from Sakai, Osaka
Japanese footballers
J1 League players
J2 League players
Kyoto Sanga FC players
Kashima Antlers players
Montedio Yamagata players
Association football forwards